The Christopher Street station was an express station on the demolished IRT Ninth Avenue Line in Manhattan in New York City. It had three tracks, one island platform and two side platforms. It was served by trains from the IRT Ninth Avenue Line. It opened on November 3, 1873 and closed on June 11, 1940. On  February 25, 1908, the Hudson and Manhattan Railroad built a subway station just east of this station as part of the extension between Hoboken and 33rd Street. The next southbound local stop was Houston Street. The next southbound express stop was Desbrosses Street. The next northbound stop was 14th Street for all trains.

References

External links 
NYCsubway.org - The IRT Ninth Avenue Elevated Line-Polo Grounds Shuttle

IRT Ninth Avenue Line stations
Railway stations in the United States opened in 1873
Railway stations closed in 1940
Former elevated and subway stations in Manhattan
1873 establishments in New York (state)
1940 disestablishments in New York (state)